Reginald Deshain Bynum (born February 10, 1964) is a former professional American football wide Receiver in the National Football League. He was the 9th-round draft pick (#222 overall) of the Buffalo Bills in the 1986 NFL Draft, playing wide receiver there in 1986.

References

External links
Reggie Bynum at NFL.com

1964 births
Living people
Sportspeople from Greenville, Mississippi
American football wide receivers
Buffalo Bills players
Oregon State Beavers football players